The Bailey-Matthews National Shell Museum is a museum devoted to every aspect of seashells, conchology, and malacology, including the paleontological and archeological/anthropological aspects of the study of shells. The museum is located in the city of Sanibel, Florida on the Gulf of Mexico coast of Southwest Florida.

The Bailey-Matthews National Shell Museum opened to the public in 1995, and operates as an information and reference center for national and international scientists, students, and shell enthusiasts, particularly those who are interested in the marine, terrestrial, and freshwater mollusks of the Gulf of Mexico and Florida. The Museum, which is a facility of the Shell Museum and Educational Foundation, Inc., received its first accreditation from the American Alliance of Museums in March 2010.

It was heavily damaged by Hurricane Ian and the museum announced on its website that it will be closed until further notice.

Sources of shells
The museum's exhibits include shells from all over the world. However, many shells on show in the museum are from Florida, and a substantial number are from Sanibel and Captiva islands. This is because Sanibel Island is one of the best seashell collecting spots in the world (comparable to Jeffreys Bay in Africa and the Sulu Archipelago in the Pacific). The museum also owns a collection of Pacific Ocean cowries and cones donated by actor Raymond Burr, who owned an island in the Fijis, and who led the efforts to raise funds to build the museum.

Facilities and programs
In addition to its 34 exhibits, public programs, and in-house resources, the museum has embarked on many collaborations with national and international educational and research institutions, and offers facilities in its collection and research area for visiting researchers, interns, and students. Resources are used by national and international professionals in the fields of environmental and marine sciences, biology, and ecology. The Museum also offers a formal field trip program for Lee County public school 4th-graders on a cost-sharing basis.

The Museum has established strong ties with many public and private sector organizations, including the United Nations’ Food and Agricultural Organization, Smithsonian Institution, American Malacological Society, Conchologists of America, Museu de Zoologia and Universidade de São Paulo in Brazil, Florida Museum of Natural History, Southwest Florida Library Network, Sanibel Public Library, The Sanibel School, Sanibel-Captiva Chamber of Commerce, Lee County's Visitor and Convention Bureau and the Tourism and Development Council, and shell clubs throughout Florida.

The museum's website includes database searches for both the museum and southwestern Florida.

The museum runs programs to educate the public, such as guided beach walks with museum naturalists who identify shells and teach mollusk biology.

History
The Bailey-Matthews National Shell Museum began with a gift of land from brothers John, Francis, and Sam Bailey in 1990 (in memory of their parents, Frank P. Bailey and Annie Mead Matthews). Malacologist, R. Tucker Abbott, was founding director. The museum building was designed by architect, George "Tutts" Tuttle Jr., from Captiva Island.

In 1993, the museum opened its campaign office and acquired a bank loan to complement a construction grant from the State of Florida Cultural Facilities Program. The grand opening was on November 18, 1995. In February 1996, malacologist, José H. Leal, was hired as director. In 1997, the museum became the publisher, with Leal as editor-in-chief, of The Nautilus, the second-oldest, English-language, shell science journal in the world.

In July 1999, the museum liquidated its original bank debt and, in May 2000, established its Cultural Endowment Fund. In 2003, the museum underwent the Museum Assessment Program by the American Alliance of Museums, and in 2004, the Conservation Assessment Program by the Institute of Museum and Library Services. In 2006, the museum received a $240,000 Cultural Endowment Matching Grant from the Florida's Division of Cultural Affairs. In 2008, its endowment surpassed $1.2 million.

In 2014, the museum changed its name from the "Bailey-Matthews Shell Museum" to the "Bailey-Matthews National Shell Museum".

Gallery

References

External links 

 Bailey-Matthews National Shell Museum

Museums in Lee County, Florida
Bailey-Matthews Shell Museum, The
Shell museums
Paleontology in Florida
Sanibel, Florida
1995 establishments in Florida
Museums established in 1995